Wooley Creek is a large stream in Siskiyou County, California, a tributary of the Salmon River. The creek drains an isolated and rugged wilderness area – there are no paved roads and only a few permanent residents in its watershed. Lower Wooley Creek provides Class IV-V (very difficult) whitewater and is seldom run due to the lack of easy access. 
The Wooley Creek Trail provides access along the creek into the wilderness area. It is one of the few major trails in the area suitable for year-round use due to its low elevation.

See also
List of rivers of California

References

Rivers of Siskiyou County, California
Wild and Scenic Rivers of the United States